Ji Yatai (October 1901 – March 12, 1968) was a Chinese diplomat. He was the 1st Ambassador of the People's Republic of China to Mongolia (1950–1953). He was Tumed Left Banner in Inner Mongolia and educated in Moscow, Soviet Union.

External links
 
 

1901 births
1968 deaths
Ambassadors of China to Mongolia
Chinese people of Mongolian descent
Members of the Standing Committee of the 2nd Chinese People's Political Consultative Conference
Members of the Standing Committee of the 3rd Chinese People's Political Consultative Conference
Members of the Standing Committee of the 4th Chinese People's Political Consultative Conference
Communist University of the Toilers of the East alumni
People from Tumed Left Banner
Chinese Communist Party politicians from Inner Mongolia
People's Republic of China politicians from Inner Mongolia